The Purple Book: A Progressive Future For Labour is a 2011 collection of essays by politicians in the UK's Labour Party, many of whom are considered to belong to the Blairite wing of the party. The book was conceived and promoted by Progress. It has been compared to The Orange Book: Reclaiming Liberalism, published seven years earlier by then-leading members of the UK's Liberal Democrats.

There are many proposed policies in the Purple Book such as: education credit, universal childcare, insurance-based welfare state, the abolition of higher-rate tax relief, the remutualisation of Northern Rock and other state-owned banks, the extension of directly elected mayors, the abolition of DCLG, extension of cooperatives and a new Department for the Nations and 'hasbos'.
The book was endorsed by many in the Labour Party including Ed Miliband, David Miliband and Maurice Glasman but received criticism from Roy Hattersley and Michael Meacher, who in particular felt it was a repetition of Conservative Party policies, though this was rejected by Rachel Reeves.

The book was designed to bring together policy proposals for Labour but to delve into its revisionists roots before Old Labour looking at ideas stemming from the Christian Socialist Movement and R. H. Tawney, calling for an effective and active government not a big state. It also shares some themes from Tony Crosland's book on The Future of Socialism. The book is broadly very supportive of the ideas promoted by Blue Labour; however Peter Mandelson wrote a chapter criticising it.

Contributors

Ed Miliband (foreword)
Douglas Alexander
Peter Mandelson
Paul Richards
Tristram Hunt
John Woodcock
Patrick Diamond 
Liam Byrne
Rachel Reeves
Frank Field
Liz Kendall
Tessa Jowell
Caroline Flint
Jenny Chapman
Jacqui Smith
Ivan Lewis
Andrew Adonis
Steve Reed
Paul Brant
Stephen Twigg
Robert Philpot

References

External links
The Purple Book (free online version), Progress

Labour Party (UK) publications
Political party factions in the United Kingdom
Books about politics of the United Kingdom
2011 non-fiction books
2011 in British politics
New Labour
Biteback Publishing books